Scott Biggs (born July 2, 1979) is an American politician who served in the Oklahoma House of Representatives from the 51st district from 2012 to 2017.

References

1979 births
Living people
Republican Party members of the Oklahoma House of Representatives
21st-century American politicians
Place of birth missing (living people)